Jonás Romero (born 21 August 2000) is an Argentine professional footballer who plays as a forward for Argentine Primera División side Atlético Tucumán.

Career

Club
Romero began in the youth system of Argentine Primera División side Atlético Tucumán. He first appeared in the Tucumán first-team for Copa Sudamericana matches against Oriente Petrolero, being an unused substitute for both second stage fixtures in July and August 2017. He was also a substitute for a Primera División match with Godoy Cruz later in August, prior to making his professional debut in September versus Independiente in the Copa Argentina. He featured for the first time in the Primera División in the club's final match of 2017–18 against Lanús.

International
In February 2018, Romero was called up to train with the Argentina U19 team.

Career statistics
.

References

External links

2000 births
Living people
Footballers from Córdoba, Argentina
Argentine footballers
Association football forwards
Argentine Primera División players
Atlético Tucumán footballers
Club Agropecuario Argentino players